Dark Angel is a 1995 Ned Kelly Award–winning novel by the Australian author John Dale.

Awards

Ned Kelly Awards for Crime Writing, Best First Novel Award, 1996: winner

Reviews
 Australian Crime Fiction database

References

 Gaughan, Thomas. "Adult books: Fiction". Booklist 92.21 (July 1996): 1807.
 King, Noel. "Infamous lives". Meanjin 58.4 (Dec. 1999): 38.

1995 Australian novels
Australian crime novels
Ned Kelly Award-winning works
1995 debut novels
Serpent's Tail books